José Villanueva Agdamag Jr. (22 June 1921 – 15 March 2011) was a Filipino sports shooter. He competed at the 1960 Summer Olympics, the 1968 Summer Olympics and 1958 Asian Games. Prior to the Olympics, he served in the 41st Infantry Division for the Philippines and survived the Bataan Death March in 1942. Along with his son, Vicente, they wrote the book 150 Days of Hell, about the Japanese invasion of the Philippines.

References

External links
 

1921 births
2011 deaths
Filipino male sport shooters
Olympic shooters of the Philippines
Shooters at the 1960 Summer Olympics
Shooters at the 1968 Summer Olympics
Sportspeople from Baguio
Filipino military personnel of World War II
Shooters at the 1958 Asian Games
Asian Games competitors for the Philippines
Filipino prisoners of war
World War II prisoners of war held by Japan
Bataan Death March prisoners